Tülay Adalı is a Distinguished University Professor of Computer Science and Electrical Engineering at the University of Maryland, Baltimore County, whose research interests include signal processing, machine learning, and data fusion.

With Simon Haykin, she is the author of the book Adaptive Signal Processing: Next Generation Solutions (Wiley, 2010), and with Eric Moreau, she is the author of Blind Identification and Separation of Complex-valued Signals (Wiley, 2013).

In 2008 she became a Fellow of the American Institute for Medical and Biological Engineering "for outstanding research, mentorship, and leadership in the field of biomedical imaging and signal processing", and in 2009 she became a Fellow of the Institute of Electrical and Electronics Engineers "For contributions to
nonlinear and complex-valued statistical signal processing". She was an IEEE Signal Processing Society Distinguished Lecturer for 2012–2013, and has been named a Fulbright Scholar for 2015.

She is the sister of computer scientist Sibel Adalı.

References

External links
Home page

Living people
American electrical engineers
Turkish women computer scientists
Turkish computer scientists
Turkish academics
Turkish electrical engineers
American women computer scientists
American women engineers
Middle East Technical University alumni
North Carolina State University alumni
University of Maryland, Baltimore County faculty
Fellow Members of the IEEE
Fellows of the American Institute for Medical and Biological Engineering
Year of birth missing (living people)
American computer scientists
21st-century American women scientists